Josiah Jesse "J.J." Ransome-Kuti (1 June 1855 – 4 September 1930) was a Nigerian clergyman and music composer. He was known for setting Christian hymns to indigenous music, and for writing Christian hymns in Yoruba.

Early life and career
Josiah Jesse Likoye Ransome-Kuti was born on June 1, 1855 in Igbein, Abeokuta, Ogun State. His family were of Egba origin and his parents, Kuti (c. 1820-1863) and Anne Ekidan Efupeyin (c. 1830-July 1877),  were both born in Abeokuta as well. Josiah's paternal grandparents, Jamo and Orukoluku, were originally from the town of Orile Igbein in the Egba forest, but had nevertheless been two of the earliest inhabitants of Abeokuta when it was founded in 1830.  Josiah Ransome-Kuti was baptized in 1859. He had 1 sister, Eruwe Lousia Kuti. While his mother, Anne, was an early convert to Christianity, his father, Kuti, was a follower of the traditional Yoruba religion, and rejected Christianity and European influence in Abeokuta. He was dismayed by his wife's conversion and frequently opposed her in her attempts to influence their son. However, in 1863, Kuti died, leaving Anne to raise him as a pious Christian. He enrolled as a student in the Church Missionary Society Training Institution, Abeokuta, before proceeding to the Church Missionary Society Training Institute, Lagos in 1871.

Shortly after completing his education at the Church Missionary Society Training Institute, Lagos, Ransome-Kuti was employed as a teacher at St. Peter's School, Ake, Abeokuta, and then left in 1879 to teach music at the CMS Girls School, Lagos, where he met his wife Bertha Anny Erinade Olubi. In 1891, he was made catechist at the Gbagura Church Parsonage, Abeokuta before he founded Gbagura Church, a local church where he converted people to the Christian faith through his versatility in rendering English gospel hymns into indigenous gospel songs.

Ransome-Kuti became a deacon in 1895, ordained a priest in 1897 and was appointed district judge from 1902 to 1906. In 1911, he was appointed pastor of St. Peter's Cathedral Church, Ake after previously serving as superintendent of the Abeokuta Church Mission.

In 1922, he was made canon of the Cathedral Church of Christ, Lagos and in 1925, he became the first Nigerian to release a record album after he recorded several Yoruba language hymns in gramophone through Zonophone Records.

Personal life
He married Bertha Erina Olubi in 1882, daughter of Rev. Daniel Olubi (1830-1912) and Susannah Olubi (nee Daley) (1821-1924). They had three children; Anne Lape Iyabode Ransome-Kuti, Azariah Olusegun and Israel Oludotun. He also had five other children from other relationships. His descendants would go on to constitute the Ransome-Kuti family. His daughter Anne had a daughter, Grace Eniola Soyinka, who was raised by Ransome-Kuti and his wife.

Bibliography

References

1855 births
1930 deaths
Ransome-Kuti family
Musicians from Abeokuta
Nigerian clergy
Nigerian composers
Yoruba Christian clergy
Yoruba musicians
Yoruba-language singers
Nigerian schoolteachers
Yoruba educators
19th-century Nigerian people
20th-century Nigerian people
20th-century Christian clergy
20th-century composers
19th-century musicians
20th-century Nigerian musicians
Music educators
Yoruba-language writers
People from Abeokuta
People from colonial Nigeria
19th-century Nigerian educators
English–Yoruba translators
19th-century translators
20th-century translators
19th-century Nigerian musicians